The 46th Japan Record Awards were held on December 31, 2004, and were broadcast live on TBS.

Award winners 
Japan Record Award:
Takeshi Kobayashi (producer), Kazutoshi Sakurai (Songwriter and Composer) & Mr. Children for Sign
Best Vocalist:
Rimi Natsukawa
Best New Artist:
Ai Otsuka

External links
Official Website

Japan Record Awards
Japan Record Awards
Japan Record Awards
Japan Record Awards
2004